William L. Crocker, Jr is an American politician who formerly served as a State Representative in the Massachusetts House of Representatives representing the 2nd Barnstable District in central Cape Cod. In the House Chamber, Crocker serves on the following committees: the Joint Committee on Children, Families and Persons with Disabilities, the Joint Committee on Mental Health, Substance Use and Recovery and the Joint Committee on Tourism, Arts and Cultural Development. Before his entrance into elected office, Crocker was a broadcast journalist, a teacher within the Bristol County House of Correction, and a high school forensics coach. Crocker was inducted into the Massachusetts Speech and Debate League Hall of Fame in 2006. He lost re-election to Kip Diggs, a construction inspector and former professional welterweight boxer, on November 3, 2020.

Electoral history
Crocker ran unopposed in the 2016 Republican Primary, therefore automatically securing the Republican nomination.

See also
 2019–2020 Massachusetts legislature

References

Living people
American male journalists
University of Maine alumni
Republican Party members of the Massachusetts House of Representatives
Year of birth missing (living people)